The 2018 Advantage Cars Prague Open, also known as Advantage Cars Prague Open by Sport-Technik Bohemia for sponsorship reasons, was a professional tennis tournament played on outdoor clay courts. It was the 25th (ATP) and fourth (ITF) editions of the tournament and was part of the 2018 ATP Challenger Tour and also of the 2018 ITF Women's Circuit as 14th edition of the tournament. It took place in Prague, Czech Republic, on 23–29 July 2018.

Men's singles main draw entrants

Seeds

 1 Rankings are as of 16 July 2018.

Other entrants
The following players received wildcards into the singles main draw:
  Marek Podlešák
  Patrik Rikl
  Jan Šátral
  Dominik Šproch

The following players received entry into the singles main draw as special exempts:
  Daniel Brands
  Jurij Rodionov

The following players received entry from the qualifying draw:
  Filip Horanský
  Pavel Nejedlý
  Marc Sieber
  Tim van Rijthoven

Women's singles main draw entrants

Seeds 

 1 Rankings as of 16 July 2018.

Other entrants 
The following players received a wildcard into the singles main draw:
  Lucie Hradecká 
  Jesika Malečková 
  Barbora Štefková 
  Iga Świątek

The following players received entry from the qualifying draw:
  Cornelia Lister
  Tena Lukas
  An-Sophie Mestach
  Lucrezia Stefanini

The following player received entry as a lucky loser:
  Anastasia Dețiuc

Champions

Men's singles

 Lukáš Rosol def.  Aleksandr Nedovyesov 4–6, 6–3, 6–4.

Women's singles

 Richèl Hogenkamp def.  Martina Di Giuseppe, 6–4, 6–2

Men's doubles

 Sander Gillé /  Joran Vliegen def.  Fernando Romboli /  David Vega Hernández 6–4, 6–2.

Women's doubles

 Cornelia Lister /  Nina Stojanović def.  Bibiane Schoofs /  Kimberley Zimmermann, 6–2, 2–6, [10–8]

External links 
 2018 Advantage Cars Prague Open at ITFtennis.com
 Official website

2018 ITF Women's Circuit
2018 ATP Challenger Tour
2018 in Czech tennis
Advantage Cars Prague Open